Lynne Neagle MS (born 18 January 1968) is a Welsh Labour & Co-operative politician. Born in Merthyr Tydfil, Glamorgan, Wales, Neagle has been the Member of the Senedd (MS) for the constituency of Torfaen since the Senedd was established in 1999.

Background
Neagle was educated at Cyfarthfa High School, Merthyr Tydfil, and the University of Reading, where she read French and Italian.

She is a former Voluntary Sector Carer and Careers Development Officer. Neagle was also a research assistant to Glenys Kinnock MEP from 1994 to 1997.

Political career
Neagle was elected to the Senedd in 1999 as a Labour candidate to represent Torfaen. Ahead of the 2011 elections she was adopted as a Labour & Co-operative candidate.

Personal life
Neagle is married to Huw Lewis, the former Senedd Member for Merthyr Tydfil and Rhymney. They have two children, James and Sam.

References

External links
Senedd Member profile
Welsh Labour website
Website of the Senedd Government

Offices held

1968 births
Living people
Welsh Labour members of the Senedd
Labour Co-operative members of the Senedd
Wales AMs 1999–2003
Wales AMs 2003–2007
Wales AMs 2007–2011
Wales AMs 2011–2016
Wales MSs 2016–2021
Wales MSs 2021–2026
Alumni of the University of Reading
People from Merthyr Tydfil
Female members of the Senedd
20th-century British women politicians